Kuhestak (also Romanized as Kūhestak, Koohastak, Kouhestak, Kūhastak, and Kūhistak) is a city in Bemani Rural District, Central, Sirik County, Hormozgan Province, Iran. At the 2006 census, its population was 2,449, in 430 families.

References 

Populated places in Sirik County
Cities in Hormozgan Province